Cyrtodactylus orlovi is a species of gecko endemic to Vietnam.

The gecko was first found in 2021, in Ninh Thuan Province.

References

Cyrtodactylus
Endemic fauna of Vietnam
Ninh Thuận province
Reptiles of Vietnam
Reptiles described in 2021